Glasgow Hillhead was a parliamentary constituency represented in the House of Commons of the Parliament of the United Kingdom from 1918 until 1997. It elected one Member of Parliament (MP) using the first-past-the-post voting system.

Boundaries 
1918–1945: "That portion of the city which is bounded by a line commencing at a point in the municipal boundary at its intersection with the centre line of the River Kelvin, thence southeastward, southward and southwestward along the centre line of the River Kelvin to the centre line of the North British Railway (Stobcross Branch), thence north-westward along the centre of the said North British Railway to its intersection with the municipal boundary, thence northeastward along the municipal boundary to the point of commencement".

1945–1974: The Glasgow wards of Kelvinside, Partick West, and part of Whiteinch.

1974–1983: The Glasgow wards of Kelvinside, Partick West, and Whiteinch.

1983–1997: The City of Glasgow District electoral divisions of Kelvindale/Kelvinside, Partick/Anderston, and Scotstoun/Broomhill.

History 
Along with Glasgow Cathcart, Hillhead was one of two safe Conservative Party seats in Glasgow for several decades. However, the majorities in both constituencies were gradually reduced by Labour in the 1970s; Cathcart was won by Labour in 1979 (the Conservative Party's only loss in their electoral victory that year), while Hillhead remained Conservative with a narrow majority. In the subsequent by-election of 1982, the Conservatives lost their sole seat in Glasgow not to Labour, but to the newly formed SDP; with the former Labour Cabinet Minister Roy Jenkins becoming the new MP for the constituency. Jenkins retained the seat for the SDP in 1983, but lost the seat to George Galloway of the Labour Party in 1987.

Members of Parliament

Election results

Elections in the 1910s

Elections in the 1920s

Elections in the 1930s

endorsed by constituency party but not by borough party

Elections in the 1940s

Elections in the 1950s

Elections in the 1960s

Elections in the 1970s

Elections in the 1980s

The constituency's boundaries were significantly altered for the 1983 general election and it was estimated by the BBC and ITN that on the new boundaries Labour would have captured the seat with a majority of just over 2,000 votes in 1979, thus making this a notional SDP gain from Labour. Neil Carmichael was the sitting Labour MP for the Glasgow Kelvingrove constituency which had been abolished for this election.

Elections in the 1990s

References 

Historic parliamentary constituencies in Scotland (Westminster)
Constituencies of the Parliament of the United Kingdom established in 1918
Constituencies of the Parliament of the United Kingdom disestablished in 1997
Politics of Glasgow
1918 establishments in Scotland
Partick
Hillhead